Jules-Paul Pasquier (1774–1858) was a French member of the Conseil d'État.

Early life
Jules-Paul Pasquier was born on 25 January 1774 in Paris. His father, Etienne Pasquier, was guillotined during the French Revolution.

Career
He served as the prefet of the Sarthe departments from 1814 to 1818. He served as a member of the Conseil d'État.

He became a Commandeur of the Legion of Honor in 1844.

Death
He died on 28 December 1858. He was buried in Coulans-sur-Gée.

References

1774 births
1858 deaths
Politicians from Paris
Prefects of Sarthe
Members of the Conseil d'État (France)
Commandeurs of the Légion d'honneur